Van As is a Dutch toponymic surname meaning "from/of As". There are a number of places named As, Asch, Asse, Assen, and Ast in the Low Countries to which "As" may refer to. People with this name or the variant Van Ass include:

Filip van As (born 1966), Dutch Christian Union politician
Gerard van As (born 1944), Dutch "List Pim Fortuyn" politician
Naomi van As (born 1983), Dutch field hockey player
Paul van Ass (born 1960), Dutch field hockey coach, unrelated to Naomi
Seve van Ass (born 1992), Dutch field hockey player, son of Paul

See also
Van Assche, Dutch surname of similar origin
S v Van As, an important case in South African criminal law

References

Dutch-language surnames
Toponymic surnames